McCarley is a surname. Notable people with the surname include:

Erin McCarley (born 1979), American singer-songwriter
Kyle McCarley, American voice actor
Mike McCarley, American businessman
Robert McCarley (1937–2017), American psychiatrist

See also
McCarley, Mississippi, unincorporated community in Mississippi, United States
McCarleys Corners, Ontario, community in Ontario, Canada
McCarley Mini-Mac, American sport aircraft